Driftmoon is an indie role-playing game developed and published by Instant Kingdom, a Finnish video game developer. It was released in 2013 for Windows, Linux, and Mac OS.

In Driftmoon, players explore a fantasy world. The game features an open-world environment and a non-linear story, allowing players to explore and make choices that affect the outcome of the game. Driftmoon is known for its engaging narrative, humor, and rich world-building. It received generally positive reviews upon release and has a loyal fanbase.

Plot
The beautiful, enchanted world of Driftmoon trembles in the shadow of a forgotten evil, for the dark King Ixal is once again gathering his forces.

Hope lies in an unlikely alliance—the player's character joins forces with a little firefly dreaming of stardom, a panther queen with the ego of a moon whale, and a very determined fellow who has lost everything except his bones. This group embarks on a journey to defeat King Ixal.

Gameplay
When Driftmoon first starts, it automatically installs any new updates. The player can turn off this feature on the "Settings" menu.

The "Settings" menu also permits the player to select whether the game runs in "fullscreen" or "windowed" mode.

At the start of a new game, the player selects a "difficulty level":

Adventurer (least difficult)
Champion
Warlord
Guardian (most difficult)

The difficulty level can be changed during gameplay via the "Options" menu.

Driftmoon'''s rudimentary set of key bindings can also be changed via the "Options" menu.  Notable key commands include "pause combat", "toggle item highlights" (to indicate items on the ground and objects in the environment for user interaction), "show map" (to display the current area's local map), and tilt camera up / down (the default view of the game's 2D graphics is a top-down perspective).

A game can be saved / loaded at any point during gameplay; Driftmoon provides eight "Save" slots. In addition, the game generates autosaves (for example, upon entering an area).

The adventure game aspect of Driftmoon is evident in its various puzzles, which are not too difficult to solve.

The game has various bosses.

Features relatively unique to Driftmoon include"

 Good game balance—the player does not need to constantly pick up drops from killed enemies and run to a merchant to sell useless items
 Waypoints—As the player explores an area, the game automatically sets waypoints
 Player feedback—Throughout the game, the player can press the "f" key to display a feedback form. The completed form is automatically sent to the developer along with, if the player desires, an automatically generated screenshot.

ReceptionDriftmoon'' has received average reviews. Aggregating review websites GameRankings and Metacritic gave the PC game 76.25% and 73/100, respectively.

GameSpot praised the game's writing and humor, but criticized the shallow combat. Destructoid noted that Driftmoon "[seemed] . . . like the perfect introduction to RPGs for someone new to the genre. It's light-hearted, not too difficult on the lower settings, and doesn't overwhelm the player with options in combat or a complicated skill tree." They similarly enjoyed the writing.

References

External links
''Driftmoon'''s official website
 

Adventure games
Role-playing video games
Windows games
Windows-only games
Top-down video games
2013 video games
Video games developed in Finland